Paolo Napoletano (born 4 February 2002) is an Italian professional footballer who plays as a forward for  club Messina on loan from Parma.

Club career
On 26 July 2022, Napoletano joined Serie C club Messina on loan.

Career statistics

Club

Notes

References

2002 births
Sportspeople from the Province of Pescara
Footballers from Abruzzo
Living people
Italian footballers
Association football forwards
Delfino Pescara 1936 players
Parma Calcio 1913 players
R.E. Virton players
A.C.R. Messina players
Challenger Pro League players
Serie C players
Italian expatriate footballers
Italian expatriate sportspeople in Belgium
Expatriate footballers in Belgium